Liszt is a crater on Mercury. It has a diameter of 85 kilometers. Its name was adopted by the International Astronomical Union (IAU) in 1985. Liszt is named for the Hungarian composer Franz Liszt, who lived from 1811 to 1886.

Liszt lies on the west side of the Tolstoj basin.

References

Impact craters on Mercury